Campomanesia phaea is a species of plant in the family Myrtaceae. The plant is endemic to the Atlantic Forest ecoregion in southeastern Brazil. It is found in the states of Paraná, Rio de Janeiro, São Paulo.

In Brazil its fruit is called cambuci and the tree cambucizeiro. Not to be confused with cambucá.

Description 

Campomanesia phaea is a semi-deciduous tree with peeling bark, that grows to between 4 and 9 metres tall. It produces dark green, saucer shaped fruits around 70mm in diameter.

This species has a low propagation rate, and efforts have been made to propagate it in vitro.

Etymology 
The name 'cambuci' comes from the Tupi-Guarani word for clay pot, because of the resemblance between the fruit and Tupi-Guarani earthenware.

Uses 

Campomanesia phaea is often cultivated in domestic gardens and orchards, for ornamental and culinary purposes. It is rare in the wild.

The cambuci fruit has an acidic, astringent flavour. It can either be eaten either raw or prepared into jellies, sherbets, or juices. The fruit is rich in vitamins and minerals and is also a source of phenolic compounds.

References

phaea
Endemic flora of Brazil
Flora of the Atlantic Forest
Flora of Paraná (state)
Flora of Rio de Janeiro (state)
Flora of São Paulo (state)
Tropical fruit
Vulnerable flora of South America
Taxonomy articles created by Polbot